Martin Nečas (born 15 January 1999) is a Czech professional ice hockey centre for the Carolina Hurricanes of the National Hockey League (NHL). Nečas made his professional debut with HC Kometa Brno in 2016, and played a prominent role on the team as they won the league championship. Regarded as a top prospect for the 2017 NHL Entry Draft, he was selected 12th overall by the Hurricanes, and made his NHL debut in 2017. Internationally Nečas plays for the Czech Republic.

Playing career

Junior
In 2012 Nečas participated in the Quebec International Pee-Wee Hockey Tournament with a youth team from Chomutov. A standout junior player, Nečas led the Czech U-16 league in scoring in 2014–15 with 91 points in 34 games, split between the junior teams of SKLH Žďár nad Sázavou and HC Kometa Brno. His production decreased in 2015–16 due to missing games from injuries and illness, appearing in only 18 games, with 9 goals and 21 assists. He made his professional debut with Brno in 2016, joining the senior team in the Czech Extraliga.

At the conclusion of the Czech Extraliga season and prior to the start of the playoffs for HC Kometa, Nečas was loaned to SK Horácká Slavia Třebíč of the 1st Czech Republic Hockey League, the second level of Czech hockey, for their playoff series, playing in their final game. Nečas appeared in 41 games for Brno during the 2016–17 season, recording 15 points. During the playoffs he scored another 4 goals in 10 games, second best on the team, and helped Brno reach the final. However he was unable to play in the final as he was instead sent to the 2017 IIHF World U18 Championships; Brno ultimately won the championship.

When the NHL Central Scouting Bureau released its mid-term rankings of eligible prospects for the 2017 NHL Entry Draft, Nečas was listed as the fifth best international skater. He maintained this position on the final list released after the conclusion of the regular season. Scouts considered him an undersized forward, but smart and someone who has good offensive instincts and a strong skater. Following his selection by the Hurricanes, 12th overall, Nečas was later signed to a three-year, entry-level contract with Carolina on 15 July 2017.

NHL
Initially it was expected that Nečas would not join the Hurricanes immediately, and instead was expected to either return to the Czech Republic, or play for the Hurricanes American Hockey League (AHL) affiliate Charlotte Checkers, or the Saginaw Spirit of the major junior Ontario Hockey League (OHL), who selected him in the Canadian Hockey League Import Draft in 2017. His play at the Hurricanes training camp, where he demonstrated his skill and earned a roster spot. The decision to keep Nečas with the team was aided due both to an injury to veteran Lee Stempniak, and that Nečas could play up to nine regular season games in the NHL before it counted against one year of his contract. Though named to the roster, Nečas was a healthy scratch and only practiced with the team, and his NHL debut came October 17 against the Edmonton Oilers. Nečas remained on the Hurricanes roster until 23 October 2017, though did not appear in any more games, when he was returned on loan to continue his development in Brno. Nečas had 17 points in 24 games, leading junior-aged players in scoring, and helped Brno win the Czech Extraliga championship for a second year in a row.

Nečas started the 2018–19 season with the Hurricanes in the NHL. On 16 October 2018, he recorded his first NHL goal on a pass from fellow rookie Warren Foegele in a 4–2 loss to the Tampa Bay Lightning. After seven games with the Hurricanes, where he had one goal and one assist, Nečas was assigned to the team's American Hockey League (AHL) affiliate.

Considered the top prospect in Carolina's system going into the 2019–20 season, Nečas was named to the team for the start of the season. He would go on to score a power play goal in the season-opening win against the Montreal Canadiens. On 9 August 2022, Nečas was re-signed to a two-year contract extension that will go until the end of the 2023–24 season at an average of $3 million per year.

International play

 

Nečas first played internationally with the Czech U-17 team at the 2015 World U-17 Hockey Challenge, where he served as captain and recorded five points in five games, leading his team in scoring. He again was captain for the Czechs at the 2016 Ivan Hlinka Memorial Tournament, an invitational tournament, where he finished seventh overall in scoring with six points in four games, helping the team win gold. He later made his debut in an International Ice Hockey Federation (IIHF) tournament at the 2017 World Junior Ice Hockey Championships, where he had three points for the Czechs. He also participated at the 2017 IIHF World U18 Championships, serving as captain of the Czech team, and had three assists in five games as the Czechs lost in the quarter-finals.

Nečas led the 2018 World Juniors with 8 assists and tied for the scoring lead (with Casey Mittelstadt of the United States) with 11 points, helping the Czechs to a fourth-place finish. He was again named to the senior team for the 2018 IIHF World Championship, finishing with 5 points in 7 games. The Hurricanes lent Nečas to the 2019 World Juniors, where he served as captain of the Czech team.

Career statistics

Regular season and playoffs

International

Awards and honors

References

External links
 

1999 births
Living people
Carolina Hurricanes draft picks
Carolina Hurricanes players
Charlotte Checkers (2010–) players
Czech ice hockey centres
HC Kometa Brno players
National Hockey League first-round draft picks
People from Nové Město na Moravě
SK Horácká Slavia Třebíč players
Sportspeople from the Vysočina Region
Czech expatriate ice hockey players in the United States